Garysburg United Methodist Church and Cemetery, also known as Chapel Grove Church, is a historic Methodist church and cemetery located on SR 1207 in Garysburg, Northampton County, North Carolina. It was built about 1853, and is a one-story, three bay, temple-form Greek Revival style frame church.  It features a projecting vestibule and a tall, graceful bell tower added in 1905.  Adjacent to the church is the cemetery.

It was listed on the National Register of Historic Places in 1985.

References

Churches on the National Register of Historic Places in North Carolina
United Methodist churches in North Carolina
Cemeteries in North Carolina
Buildings and structures in Northampton County, North Carolina
Methodist cemeteries
National Register of Historic Places in Northampton County, North Carolina